John Fine may refer to:
 John Fine (politician) (1794–1867), a U.S. Representative from New York
 John Christopher Fine, American author, attorney, marine biologist, photojournalist
 John S. Fine (1893–1978), former Governor of Pennsylvania
 John Van Antwerp Fine, Jr. (1939–), American historian, Princeton University professor